Countess Irma Sztáray de Sztára et Nagymihály (10 July 1863 – 3 September 1940) was a Hungarian courtier and memoirist. She was the last lady-in-waiting of Empress Elisabeth of Austria, and the sole companion traveling with the empress when she was assassinated.

Life
The Hungarian countess Irma was born as the daughter of Count Viktor Stáray de Sztára et Nagymihály (Hu) (1823–1879) and Countess Mária Török de Szendrõ (Hu) (1835–1916). She never married, as she dedicated her whole life to the Empress and the court.

She accompanied Elisabeth during her last four years, from 1894 until 1898, on her journeys to Hungary, Italy, Switzerland, Algeria and Greece. Her memoirs Aus den letzten Jahren der Kaiserin Elisabeth, which she wrote many years after Empress Elisabeth's death, were published in German and are a valuable source which gives detailed insights into Sisi's final years.

For her services, Irma Sztáray received a medal of honour from Emperor Franz Joseph I right after Elisabeth's assassination.

In popular culture
The upcoming German-Austrian-Swiss film Sisi & I tells the story of Empress Elisabeth of Austria from the point of view of her lady-in-waiting, Sztáray, who is portrayed by German actress Sandra Hüller.
The abovementioned book reflects indeed the point of view of the countess and might have given some political ideas to some persons. However, it is certainly not the basis of the movie shot during the 50s in which  Romy Schneider played the role of a fictitious young Empress Elisabeth. The Countess describes the last years of Sissi's life.

References

1863 births
1940 deaths
Hungarian countesses
Austrian ladies-in-waiting
19th-century memoirists
Women memoirists